Jost is both a German given name and a surname and a Jewish (Ashkenazi) surname. Notable people with the name include:

Given name 
 Jost Amman (1539–1591), Swiss 
 Jost Bürgi (1552–1632), Swiss clockmaker, maker of astronomical instruments, and mathematician
 Jost Metzler (1909–1975), German submarine commander during World War II
 Jost Vacano (born 1934), German cinematographer
Jost Capito (born 1958), German Motorsport manager and current CEO and team principal of Williams Racing Formula One team

Surname 
 Alfred Jost (1916–1991), French endocrinologist
 Christian Jost (born 1963), German composer
 Christian Jost, French geographer
 Colin Jost (born 1982), American writer and comedian
 Heinz Jost (1904–1964), Nazi war criminal
 Henry L. Jost (1873–1950), U.S. politician
 Isaak Markus Jost (1793–1860) Jewish historical writer
 Jeffrey Jost, American bobsledder
 John Jost (born 1968), American social psychologist
 Jon Jost (born 1943), American independent filmmaker
 Jürgen Jost, German mathematician 
 Matthieu Jost (figure skater) (born 1981), French ice dancer
 Mike Jost (born 1979), American musician
 Peter Jost (1921–2016), German-British mechanical engineer of Jewish descent, founder of tribology
 Res Jost (1918–1990), Swiss theoretical physicist
 Tyson Jost (born 1998), Canadian hockey player

See also 
 Jost Van Dyke, an island in the British Virgin Islands
 Joest (disambiguation)

German-language surnames
German masculine given names
Jewish surnames

de:Jost